Sutton Scotney is a village in Hampshire, England, north of Winchester in the civil parish of Wonston.

It lies alongside the River Dever and is now bypassed by the A34 trunk road. It is notable for having been the site of numerous Spitfire crashes in the Second World War.

It has a population of more than 200, and had a watercress-based economy. Its best-known resident was J. Arthur Rank who took the name of the village as part of his title when he was ennobled.

The village pub, the Coach & Horses, dates back to 1762.  The pub was recently refurbished and converted the former thatched village Fire station into bed and breakfast rooms.

The village is home to Naomi House & Jacksplace, hospices that care for life-limited children and young people from across the Wessex region.

Transport
Stagecoach bus route 86 (Whitchurch to Winchester) serves Sutton Scotney. There was formerly a railway station but this closed in 1960.

There is a service area called Sutton Scotney Services on the village's A34 bypass.

References

External links
 Coach & Horses pub

Villages in Hampshire